Darjazin (also Romanized as Darjazīn; also known as Darvazīn and Daryazīn) is a village in Darjazin-e Sofla Rural District, Qorveh-e Darjazin District, Razan County, Hamadan Province, Iran. At the 2006 census, its population was 2,629, in 689 families.

History 
In the 11th century, the Darjazin area had a significant population of Mazdakis and the related Khorramites. The Dargazini family of viziers was also from the area.

The 14th-century author Hamdallah Mustawfi described Darjazin (as Darguzīn) as previously "merely a village of the A‘lam district" that had become "a provincial capital" by his lifetime. He wrote that it had good agricultural lands that produced grain, cotton, grapes, and other fruits. Its population, he said, were devout Sunnis of the Shafi'i madhhab who followed the Shaykh al-Islam Sharaf ad-Din Darguzini. The revenue of Darguzin, he wrote, was 12,000 dinars.

The Ottoman traveller Evliya Çelebi passed through Darjazin in 1654 and left a description of the town's layout, as well as its garrison and fort. Evliya associated the fort with an unspecified Sasanian king named Yazdegerd, which possibly refers to Yazdegerd I. No traces of the fort survive today. By the time of Evliya's visit, Darjazin's population had become Shi'i; he described the Moharram mourning rites observed here. In the 1700s, Darjazin became contested between Iran and the Ottoman Empire.

Shrine 
The shrine of Emamzadeh Azhar in Darjazin is dated to the Ilkhanid era; it may be the tomb of either Shaykh Salman 'Aref Dargazini (13th century) or the above-mentioned Sharaf ad-Din Dargazini (14th century). The shrine itself has a circular tower with a conical dome that reaches 12 m off the ground at its highest point. There is a wooden chest in the shrine which bears the date 1056 AH, or 1646 CE; part of the chest is missing.

References 

Populated places in Razan County